Gari Dasht Kuh (also Romanized as Garī Dasht Kūh) is a village in Kahnuk Rural District, Irandegan District, Khash County, Sistan and Baluchestan Province, Iran. At the 2006 census, its population was 24, in 6 families.

References 

Populated places in Khash County